Xander James Speight (born 25 March 1996) is an Australian actor. He is best known for his role as Parker in the ABC 3 TV series Worst Year of My Life Again.

Filmography

Film

Television

Awards

References

External links

Living people
Australian male television actors
Australian male film actors
21st-century Australian male actors
1996 births